Old Pine may refer to:

 Old Pine (EP), an EP by Ben Howard
 Old Pine (song), a song by Ben Howard